The Canton of Aumale is a former canton situated in the Seine-Maritime département and in the Haute-Normandie region of northern France. It was disbanded following the French canton reorganisation which came into effect in March 2015. It consisted of 15 communes, which joined the canton of Gournay-en-Bray in 2015. It had a total of 7,073 inhabitants (2012).

Geography 
An area of farming, forestry and light industry in the arrondissement of Dieppe, centred on the town of Aumale. The altitude varies from 76 m (Vieux-Rouen-sur-Bresle) to 246 m (Conteville with an average altitude of 187 m.

The canton comprised 15 communes:

Aubéguimont
Aumale
Le Caule-Sainte-Beuve
Conteville
Criquiers
Ellecourt
Haudricourt
Illois
Landes-Vieilles-et-Neuves
Marques
Morienne
Nullemont
Richemont
Ronchois
Vieux-Rouen-sur-Bresle

Population

See also 
 Arrondissements of the Seine-Maritime department
 Cantons of the Seine-Maritime department
 Communes of the Seine-Maritime department

References

Aumale
2015 disestablishments in France
States and territories disestablished in 2015